Courtney Duever (born December 27, 1991) is an American professional basketball player.

Career

College
Duever played college basketball at the University of Central Arkansas in Conway, Arkansas for the Sugar Bears in the Southland Conference of NCAA Division I.

Central Arkansas statistics

Source

Europe
After her college career, Duever began her professional career with Montana 2003 in the Bulgarian Women's Basketball Championship. There, she averaged 17.6 points and 9.1 rebounds per game.

Australia
After impressive showings for the Sunbury Jets in the semi-professional Big V competition, Duever has been signed by the Melbourne Boomers for the 2017–18 WNBL season. This will be the highest level of competition in her career. Duever will play under Guy Molloy, alongside the likes of Liz Cambage & Jenna O'Hea.

References

1991 births
Living people
American women's basketball players
University of Central Arkansas alumni
Basketball players from Austin, Texas
Melbourne Boomers players
Centers (basketball)
Forwards (basketball)
21st-century American women